Marie-Jeanne de Mailly (1747-1792) was a French court official.  She served as the dame d'atour to Queen Marie Antoinette from 1775 to 1781. 

She was the daughter of count Gabriel-Marie de Talleyrand-Périgord (1726-1797) and Marie-Françoise-Marguerite de Talleyrand-Périgord, and married Duke Louis-Marie de Mailly (1744-1795). She was appointed lady-in-waiting to Marie Antoinette in 1770, and became dame d'atour in 1775.  During her tenure, the costs of Marie Antoinette's wardrobe raised to enormous levels. In contrast to her predecessor, Laure-Auguste de Fitz-James, Princess de Chimay, Mailly does not seem to have curbed this development. Her successor, Geneviève d'Ossun, started work to reduce the costs of the queen's wardrobe.

References

1747 births
1792 deaths
French ladies-in-waiting